Landscape with the Flight into Egypt may refer to several landscape paintings that include the biblical Flight into Egypt, including:

 Landscape with the Flight into Egypt (Bruegel), a 1563 painting by Pieter Bruegel the Elder, in the Courtauld Gallery, London
 Landscape with the Flight into Egypt (Carracci), a 1604 painting by Annibale Carracci, in the Galleria Doria Pamphilj, Rome

See also
 Flight into Egypt (disambiguation)
 Rest on the Flight into Egypt (disambiguation)